Željko Bilecki (born 28 April 1950) is a Canadian retired soccer player.

Club career 
Bilecki played at the youth level with Toronto Croatia's junior team in 1969. In 1970, he played in the National Soccer League with Toronto Croatia's senior team. He was named the league's top goalkeeper twice in 1971, and 1972. In 1974, he assisted in securing the NSL Championship against Toronto Homer. For the 1975 season he played in the North American Soccer League with Toronto Metros-Croatia.

He later played for three other NASL sides in the United States: Tampa Bay Rowdies, Los Angeles Aztecs and Tulsa Roughnecks. He won a Soccer Bowl with Toronto in 1976 and was a runner-up in 1979 for Tampa Bay. He was the back up goalie for Tulsa when they won Soccer Bowl '83. Bilecki also won the NASL's indoor title in 1979–80 with Tampa Bay.

International career 
Bilecki made his debut for Canada on 22 December 1976 in a 3–0 victory against the United States in a World Cup qualification match in Port-au-Prince. He won two more caps the next year, the last of these coming in a 2–1 win over Suriname on 12 October 1977 in Mexico City, where he came on at the start of the second half to replace Tony Chursky.

References

External links

 NASL career stats

1950 births
Living people
Footballers from Zagreb
Yugoslav emigrants to Canada
Croatian emigrants to Canada
Naturalized citizens of Canada
Association football goalkeepers
Yugoslav footballers
Canadian soccer players
Canada men's international soccer players
Toronto Croatia players
Toronto Blizzard (1971–1984) players
Tampa Bay Rowdies (1975–1993) players
Los Angeles Aztecs players
Tulsa Roughnecks (1978–1984) players
Canadian National Soccer League players
North American Soccer League (1968–1984) players
North American Soccer League (1968–1984) indoor players
Yugoslav expatriate footballers
Canadian expatriate soccer players
Expatriate soccer players in the United States
Canadian expatriate sportspeople in the United States
Yugoslav expatriate sportspeople in the United States